Marcelo Tecolapa Tixteco (born 25 October 1960) is a Mexican politician affiliated with the Institutional Revolutionary Party. As of 2014 he served as Deputy of the LIX Legislature of the Mexican Congress representing Guerrero.

References

1960 births
Living people
Politicians from Guerrero
Institutional Revolutionary Party politicians
Autonomous University of Guerrero alumni
21st-century Mexican politicians
Deputies of the LIX Legislature of Mexico
Members of the Chamber of Deputies (Mexico) for Guerrero